Saiichiro Miyamura (June 1893 – ?) was a Japanese politician who served as governor of Hiroshima Prefecture from June 15, 1942 to July 1, 1943.

Governors of Hiroshima
1893 births
Japanese Home Ministry government officials
Year of death missing